Nunziante is given name and surname. Notable people with the name include:

Surname 
 Gennaro Nunziante (born 1963), Italian film director
 Vito Nunziante (1775–1836), Italian general, politician and entrepreneur

Given name 
  (born 1964), Italian politician
 Nunziante Ippolito (1796–1851), Italian physician and anatomist